Yrgyz District is a district of Aktobe Region in Kazakhstan. The administrative center of the district is the selo of Yrgyz. Population:

Geography 
Shalkarteniz is located in the district. The Lakes of the lower Turgay and Irgiz Nature Reserve is a protected area located in the district.

References

Districts of Kazakhstan
Aktobe Region